Statistics of Belgian First Division in the 1952–53 season.

Overview

It was contested by 16 teams, and R.F.C. de Liège won the championship.

League standings

Results

References

Belgian Pro League seasons
1952–53 in Belgian football
Belgian